Noah Burton (18 December 1896 – 1956) was an English footballer who played in the Football League for Derby County and Nottingham Forest.

References

1896 births
1956 deaths
English footballers
Association football forwards
English Football League players
Ilkeston United F.C. players
Derby County F.C. players
Nottingham Forest F.C. players